Maulana Shah Dauran was an Islamist militant from Swat, Pakistan. He was a deputy of Fazlullah, the chief of the Pakistani Taliban in Swat. He was one of the most wanted militants and the closest aide of Swat Taliban chief Maulana Fazlullah. He was known for his hawkish views against the opponents.  The government of Khyber Pakhtunkhwa announced a 10 million rupees bounty on Dauran.

Early life 
Shah Dauran, the son of a chowkidar (watchman) at a local fuel station, was the resident of Qambar village of Swat close to Mingora, where he ran a madrasah. Dauran sold bakery products. He gave up selling bakery products and began challenging the writ of the government on radio with threats to people opposing the Taliban.

Tehreek-e-Nafaz-e-Shariat-e-Mohammadi 
He joined the Taliban group in 2007 and soon became an important member of its shura (consultative body). His leader Maulana Fazlullah was broadcasting his show on an FM radio channel heard in upper parts of Swat while Dauran used to run his FM channel in lower Swat. Unlike Fazlullah's polite tone, Shah Dauran is said to be harsh in his broadcasts.  He went to Afghanistan several times and participated in Afghan jihad.

FM radio or Mullah radio 
Shah Dauran often used his FM channel to warn government employees to back the Taliban or leave their service. He also used the radio to claim responsibility for Taliban attacks. On 28 December, he claimed responsibility for the suicide bombing killing 44 people at a polling station in Shalbandai village in Buner district. On another occasion, he proudly announced that Taliban had killed a female dancer, Shabana, in Mingora.  It was Dauran who announced to ban girls education in Swat.  In his later days, when Fazlullah was hiding from Pak Army, he led the Taliban in Swat.

Death 
He died on 17 December 2009 in Bajaur after a protracted illness. The sources said that he was hiding somewhere in Bajaur, was suffering from kidney disease and injuries suffered by him during the fighting in Swat had become gangrenous. His condition deteriorated due to lack of proper medication in the remote tribal region and he died eventually. He was buried in Damadola, Bajur Agency.

References

See also 
Fazlullah (Militant leader)
Second Battle of Swat
Tehreek-e-Nafaz-e-Shariat-e-Mohammadi

People from Swat District
Tehrik-i-Taliban Pakistan members
Pashtun people
Pakistani Islamists